Stephen Hylton (born 23 October 1964) is a Jamaican table tennis player. He competed in the men's singles event at the 1996 Summer Olympics.

References

External links
 

1964 births
Living people
Jamaican male table tennis players
Olympic table tennis players of Jamaica
Table tennis players at the 1996 Summer Olympics
Place of birth missing (living people)